A pocket symphony is a song with extended form. The term was popularized by English journalist Derek Taylor, who used it to describe the Beach Boys' 1966 single "Good Vibrations". (The description of a "pocket" symphony had appeared in print since as early as 1928.)

Attributions

Popular music
 The Beatles – "A Day in the Life" (1967)
 T. Rex – "Telegram Sam" (1971)
 Serge Gainsbourg – Histoire de Melody Nelson (1971)
 Paul McCartney & Wings – "Band on the Run" (1973)
 Queen – "Bohemian Rhapsody" (1975)
 Radiohead - "Paranoid Android" (1997)
 Weezer - "The Greatest Man That Ever Lived (Variations on a Shaker Hymn)" (2008)
 The Beach Boys - "Good Vibrations" (1966)

Classical compositions
 Havergal Brian – Symphony No. 12
 Wolfgang Amadeus Mozart – Eine kleine Nachtmusik

See also
 Pocket Symphonies
 Pocket Symphonies for Lonesome Subway Cars

References

The Beach Boys
Symphonies
Song forms